(1542–1627) was a Japanese samurai of the Azuchi-Momoyama period who served the Oda clan. Near the end of his life, Kanematsu Masayoshi became a retainer of the Tokugawa family of Owari.

Samurai
1542 births
1627 deaths